Jammu and Kashmir Public Service Commission widely known as JKPSC, is a constitutional body formed by the Government of India under articles 128 and 133 which conducts the civil services examination for appointment to various civil services in the Indian administered union territory of Jammu and Kashmir. The JKPSC, autonomous body select the officers for various key positions in state civil services according to the merits of the candidates and the rules of reservation.

History 
The history of Jammu and Kashmir Public Service Commission begins with the Jammu and Kashmir Civil Services Regulation volume-II, which explains the civil services of the state. The concept of conducting statewide competitive examination for appointment to specific posts came into consideration way back between 1954-1957. During the Dogra Rule Maharaja Hari Singh had introduced Civil Service examination for the first time in the state in 1941. Before that the Maharaja used to nominate candidates for civil service training who after completing the training would join the state government. Agha Nasir Ali was the first Kashmiri to top the civil service examination when they were introduced for the first time in 1941. He was the first Deputy Commissioner of Srinagar. Later, previous rules were revoked by the Kashmir Civil Service Rules-1954. The formation of JKPSC is revealed by the Indian public service commissions which further explains the Constitution of India in Part XXI along with Article 370, giving autonomous status. Section 128 of the Constitution of J&K describes the formation of JKPSC which indicates the commission was set up on 2 September 1957.

Background 
The Jammu and Kashmir Public Service Commission is the top-most constitutional body and senior-most civil services of the Government of India. Its headquarters are located in Solina area of Srinagar city, 190009. The Commission is headed by its chairman who is responsible for the recruitment process, JKPSC policy formulation, and its implementation. The commission chairman including other members are appointed by the state governor. The governor has the right to determine the number of members as well as the members of the commission and their terms of service under certain sections of J&K state.

Commission office shift 

Every year, the commission shift its office from one capital to another for the period of six months. It occurs twice in a year, making the JKPSC functioning from May to October in summer capital Srinagar and from November to April in winter capital Jammu. In 1872, Maharaja Gulab Singh started this practice to escape the extreme heat during summers in Jammu and freezing wave of winter in Srinagar where temperature often drop as low as -6 to -4 degrees Celsius.

Members
The commission consists of 4 members including Chairman who holds different positions for specific roles.

Duties and functions
To conducts statewide civil services examinations and recruitment process for appointments to the various posts on state level.
Every year, it submits a report about the work done by the commission to the state governor.
To ensure the procedures of transfer, promotion, recruitment, and dismissals of civil services posts constitutionally prescribed principles.
To Report its activities of the performance including any finding in accordance with prescribed values and principles constitutionally.
To investigate and analyze the application of personnel and public administration practices, and report to the relevant executive authority and legislature of Jammu & Kashmir.
The commission shall be consulted on all disciplinary matters affecting a person serving under the Government including memorials or petitions relating to such matters.
To advise on any matter referred to them in compliance with the section 133 of the Constitution of the Indian states.

Examinations conducted by the commission 
Jammu and Kashmir Public Service Commission conducts the various Competitive Examinations and Departmental examinations as mandated by section 137 in Part IX of the Constitution of Jammu and Kashmir.

Competitive examinations 
Kashmir Administrative Service
KCS (Judicial)
Medical Officers(Allopathy) 
Veterinary Assistant Surgeon 
Range Officers (wildlife/Territorial/Soil).
Assistant Director (Statistics)
Assistant Conservator Of Forest (ACF)

Departmental examinations 
Excise and Taxation Officers
Excise and Taxation Inspectors
Excise and Taxation Sub-Inspectors
Revenue Service (Executive)
KAS Probationers
Subordinate Accounts Course (SAC-I)
Subordinate Accounts Course (SAC-II)
Accounts Clerk Course (ACC)
IAS Probationers
Labour Inspectors/Officers
Executive Engineer (Accounts)
Assistant Engineer (Accounts) 
Junior Statistical Assistant Course 
Statistical Assistant Course
Statistical Officer

See also

 List of Public service commissions in India

References

External links
 

 State agencies of Jammu and Kashmir
 Government agencies established in 1957
 State public service commissions of India
1957 establishments in Jammu and Kashmir
 Jammu and Kashmir civil services